Champasak may refer to
 Champasak Province
 Champasak (town)
 Champasak F.C., former name of SHB Vientiane F.C.
 Kingdom of Champasak
 Na Champassak family